6ix may refer to:
The 6ix, a nickname for Toronto, Ontario, Canada
6iX (radio station), in Perth, Western Australia
6ix (record producer) (Arjun Ivatury, born 1991), an American record producer 
Fly 6ix, a former airline

See also

 6 (disambiguation)
 The Six (disambiguation)
 6ix9ine, an American rapper 
 6ixBuzz, an entertainment and hip hop music media platform
6ixUpsideDown, a 2018 compilation album
 6ix by 3hree, a 1989 video compilation by Duran Duran
 6IX RISING, a Canadian documentary film
 AB6IX, a South Korean boy group
6ixense, a 2018 album
 Da Mafia 6ix, an American hip hop group
6ix Commandments, a 2013 album
 Seed of 6ix, an American hip hop group
 Yung6ix, a Nigerian hip hop artist